Ogge is a lake in the municipalities of Birkenes and Iveland in Agder county, Norway. The  lake includes about 360 islands and reefs. The Sørlandsbanen railway line and the Norwegian County Road 405 both run along the west side of the lake.

Recreation
Ogge is a place for canoeing and kayaking.  It has a number of camping sites with restrooms and picnic facilities on many of the small islands. Very little of the shoreline is private property.  On canoe trips, there are moose (Alces alces), beaver, and varied birdlife.  Canoes can be rented locally.

See also
List of lakes in Aust-Agder
List of lakes in Norway

References

External links
Ogge padleguide 
Ogge Gjesteheim 

Birkenes
Iveland
Lakes of Agder